Actinochaetopteryx japonica is a species of parasitic fly in the family Tachinidae.

Distribution
Japan, Russia, Taiwan.

References

Diptera of Asia
Dexiinae
Insects described in 1970
Insects of Japan
Insects of Taiwan
Insects of Russia